Birthe Neumann (born 30 April 1947 in Vanløse, Copenhagen) is a Danish actress.

In 1972 she graduated from the Danish National School of Theatre, and was shortly afterwards employed as an actress at the Royal Danish Theatre in Copenhagen.
At the Royal Danish Theatre she has appeared in a number of productions, among them Marx and Coca Cola, Molière's The Learned Ladies, Henrik Hertz's Sparekassen (The Savings Bank), Jess Ørnsbo's Majonæse (Mayonnaise), Arthur Miller's Death of a Salesman, and David Hare's A Breath of Life.
Her film appearances include Hovedjægerne (her first film role, in 1971; released internationally as The Headhunters), Lad isbjørnene danse (1990, Dance of the Polar Bears), Kærlighedens Smerte (1992, Pain of Love), The Celebration (1998, Festen, the first Dogme 95 film), Elsker dig for evigt og (2002, Open Hearts, also a Dogme film) and Lykkevej (Move Me, 2003).
She has also appeared in Danish television series including Lars von Trier's Riget (The Kingdom), Forsvar (Defense), and as a repeated guest star on Krøniken (Chronicles).
She has received both of Denmark's leading film awards: a Bodil for her performances in Kærlighedens smerte and Lykkevej, and a Robert for Lykkevej.
In 2013, she received the Lauritzen Award.

Neumann is married to Danish actor Paul Hüttel; they have one daughter.

References

External links 
 
 
 

1947 births
Actresses from Copenhagen
Danish actresses
Living people
Best Actress Bodil Award winners
Best Supporting Actress Bodil Award winners
Best Actress Robert Award winners